Anthony Farah is a Lebanese professional rugby league player who has played as a  for the Mount Pritchard Mounties in the New South Wales Cup. He also played in a other cup and both won Round 1 and 2 in 2002, Round 6 in 2003. Lebanon vs France was 36-6, Lebanon vs Serbia was 102-0 and Lebanon vs France was 26-18. It was named the Mediterranean Cup 2002 and 2003. 

Farah is a Lebanese international. He captained the Lebanon side in their 36-10 win over Malta on 8 Oct 2006 in Sydney.

References

Living people
Rugby league hookers
Lebanese rugby league players
Lebanon national rugby league team captains
Lebanon national rugby league team players
Year of birth missing (living people)